MFO may refer to:

Organisations
 Maison Française d'Oxford, a French research institute based in Oxford, England
 Multinational Force and Observers, an international peacekeeping force; or the related medal
 Maschinenfabrik Oerlikon, a defunct Swiss manufacturing company, merged into Brown, Boveri & Cie in 1967
 Mathematisches Forschungsinstitut Oberwolfach (Mathematical Research Institute of Oberwolfach), in Germany
 MrFixitOnline, a prominent gaming site focusing on online games, notably Age of Empires II: The Age of Kings that specialized in expert strategy and high caliber tournaments, in operation from ~2000 - 2006.
 Multi-family office, organisations which protect and grow the wealth of several families by providing full growth and philanthropic investment advice.

Entertainment
 MFÖ, a Turkish band
 My Family Online, a website/forum for hit BBC One sitcom, My Family

Science
 In immunology, Multi Function Oxidase
 Mixed-function oxidase

Other
 MFO, IATA airport code of Manguna Airport in Papua New Guinea
 Marine Fuel Oil